A Night at the Vanguard (also released as Man at Work) is a live album by guitarist Kenny Burrell recorded in 1959 at the Village Vanguard and originally released on the Argo label.

Reception

Allmusic awarded the album 4½ stars and reviewer Michael Erlewine described it as: "A solid effort top to bottom, and a recording most highly recommended, this is Burrell and his extraordinary trio very close to, if not truly in their prime, and their element".

Track listing

Personnel 
Kenny Burrell - guitar
Richard Davis - bass
Roy Haynes - drums

References 

Kenny Burrell live albums
1959 live albums
Argo Records live albums
Albums recorded at the Village Vanguard